The Recoil is a 1922 British silent crime film directed by Geoffrey Malins and starring Annie Esmond, Lawrence Anderson and Dawson Millward.

The film's plot involves a psychic expert who hypnotises his cousin to shoot his rich uncle. The film is based on a novel by Rafael Sabatini and was made by Stoll Pictures at Cricklewood Studios.

Cast
 Annie Esmond as Miss Orpington 
 Lawrence Anderson as Digby Raikes  
 Dawson Millward as Anthony Orpington  
 Eille Norwood as Francis  
 Phyllis Titmuss as Adelaide Wallace

References

Bibliography
 Goble, Alan. The Complete Index to Literary Sources in Film. Walter de Gruyter, 1999.

External links
 

1922 films
1922 crime films
British crime films
British silent feature films
1920s English-language films
Films set in England
Films based on British novels
Films directed by Geoffrey Malins
Stoll Pictures films
British black-and-white films
Films shot at Cricklewood Studios
1920s British films